Kekkonen's fifth cabinet was the 39th government of Finland. The cabinet existed from 20 October 1954 to 3 March 1956. It was a majority government. Prime Minister Urho Kekkonen was elected the President of Finland on February 15 February 1956, resigning as Prime Minister and dissolving the cabinet in the process.

Kekkonen, 5
1954 establishments in Finland
1956 disestablishments in Finland
Cabinets established in 1954
Cabinets disestablished in 1956
Cabinet 5